Jordan Zamora is an Australian motorcycle racer. In 2010, he participated for the first time in a 125cc World Championship event, as a wild-card rider in the Australian round at Phillip Island, but failed to qualify for the race.

Grand Prix motorcycle racing

By season

Races by year
(key) (Races in bold indicate pole position)

References

External links
 http://www.motogp.com/en/riders/Jordan+Zamora
 http://www.ma.org.au/index.php?id=1329

Living people
Australian motorcycle racers
125cc World Championship riders
Year of birth missing (living people)